The Fighter Mafia was a controversial group of U.S. Air Force officers and civilian defense analysts who, in the 1960s and 1970s, advocated for fighter design criteria in opposition to those of the design boards of the time. Their assertions included: 
 Contemporary Air Force generals established poor criteria for combat effectiveness that ignored historical combat data. 
 Design focus on high technology and planes that could go "higher, faster, and farther" increased costs and decreased effectiveness. The group's view was that cheaper designs would have been more effective.
 The bureaucracy of the Air Force was corrupt, allegedly dishonestly testing weapons before buying them and deploying them in the field.
 The focus of the USAF should have been on close air support and the use of combined arms to support maneuver warfare rather than interdiction bombing. 
 Multi-role and multi-mission capability plane designs were fundamentally compromised compared to specialized designs.
 Beyond visual range combat was a fantasy. 
The Fighter Mafia also advocated the use of John Boyd and Thomas P. Christie's energy-maneuverability (E-M) theory in designing fighter aircraft. The E-M model enabled quantitative comparison of the performance of aircraft in terms of air combat maneuvering in the context of dogfighting. The Fighter Mafia influenced the specifications for the F-X and went on to independently develop specifications for the Light Weight Fighter (LWF).

The next generation of warplanes combined both maneuverability (which the group advocated) as well as large active radars and radar-guided missiles (which they opposed). Aircraft in this generation included the F-14, F-15, F-16 and F/A-18.

Name
The nickname, a professional jest coined by Everest Riccioni, an Air Force member of Italian heritage, was a rejoinder to the "Bomber Mafia", theorists at the Air Corps Tactical School in the 1930s whose ideas led to the primacy of heavy bomber aircraft performing strategic bombing over that of fighter.

History
In the 1960s, both the U.S. Air Force and U.S. Navy were in the process of acquiring large, heavy fighters designed primarily to fight with missiles. Project Forecast, a 1963 Air Force attempt to identify future weapons trends, stated that a counter air defense must be able to destroy aircraft at long ranges using advanced weapon systems. The Air Force felt that these needs would be filled for the next twenty years by missile-armed variants of the F-111 and F-4 Phantom II with no gun. Their F-X fighter acquisition program, initially merged into the TFX program (which developed the F-111), was written along those lines.

Combat during the Vietnam War demonstrated that the entire "Missileer" concept was not ready for real combat conditions. Restrictive rules of engagement (ROE), limitations in communications (IFF), unreliable missiles and a wide variety of other problems conspired to make air-to-air combat devolve into dogfights far more often than US air combat tacticians had envisioned. In spite of a huge technical superiority on paper and some very successful BVR missile aces, the F-4s found themselves fighting at close quarters with the so-called "inferior" Soviet-designed MiG-21, and losing the fight more often than expected. Heavy and poorly maneuverable fighters originally imagined by the F-X program would be even worse off in these situations.

Boyd's work with E-M modeling demonstrated that the F-111 would be poorly suited to the role of fighter, and the Air Force F-X proposal was quietly rewritten to reflect his findings, dropping a heavy swing-wing from the design, lowering the gross weight from 60,000+ pounds to slightly below 40,000, and decreasing the top speed from Mach 2.7 to 2.3–2.5. The result was the F-15 Eagle, an aircraft that was far superior in maneuverability to the F-111 fighter variants. The Air Force had also been studying a lighter day fighter. Starting in 1965, the Air Force had pursued a low-priority study of the Advanced Day Fighter (ADF), a 25,000 pound design. After they learned of the MiG-25 in 1967, a minor panic broke out and the ADF was dropped in order to focus work on the F-15. The F-15, originally a lighter aircraft, grew in size and weight as it attempted to match the inflated performance estimates of the MiG-25. While Boyd's contributions to the F-15 were significant, he felt that it was still a compromise.

Boyd, defense analysts Tom Christie, Chuck Myers, test pilot Col. Everest Riccioni and aeronautical engineer Harry Hillaker formed the core of the "Fighter Mafia" which worked behind the scenes in the late 1960s to pursue a lightweight fighter as an alternative to the F-15. The group strongly believed that an ideal fighter should not include any of the radar-guided missile systems, active radar or rudimentary ground-attack capability that found their way into the F-15. Riccioni coined the nickname, a joke on his Italian heritage that harkened back to the "Bomber Mafia" (whose acolytes still occupied the upper command positions of the Air Force) and dubbed himself the "godfather". In 1969, under the guise that the Navy was developing a small, high-performance Navy aircraft, Riccioni won $149,000 to fund the "Study to Validate the Integration of Advanced Energy-Maneuverability Theory with Trade-Off Analysis". This money was split between Northrop and General Dynamics to build the embodiment of Boyd's E-M theory – a small, low-drag, low-weight, pure air-to-air fighter with no bomb racks. Northrop demanded and received $100,000 to design the YF-17; General Dynamics, eager to redeem its debacle with the F-111, received the remainder to develop the YF-16.

In the summer of 1971, deputy defense secretary David Packard announced a budget of $200 million to be spent on prototypes from all the services branches. Defense Secretary Melvin Laird and his deputy David Packard had entered office with the Nixon administration in 1969 and were tasked with whipping the military purchasing system into shape. This was in response to Senator William Proxmire issuing reports critical of the high costs of the F-15 and F-14. Packard was interested in the idea of prototyping weapons before sending them intro production, given issues stemming from McNamara's "Total Package Procurement Concept" where analysis and quantification was done on paper. The 1972 fiscal year budget assigned $12 million for Lightweight Fighter prototypes. On January 6, 1971, an RFP was issued to industry for a 20,000 pound fighter to complement the F-15.

Criticism 
Critics argue that the F-15 and F-16 succeeded because they moved away from the Fighter Mafia's ideas, seeing significant export success because they were multi-role aircraft with radar-guided missiles. This is despite the F-16 being originally designed as an air-to-air superiority fighter with design trade-offs that were suboptimal for the multi-role capabilities added on. The critics point to the F-15 and F-16's excellent track record in combat in Lebanon and other conflicts, with extremely lopsided kill ratios.

Proponents of the F-35 argue that fourth-generation fighters like the F-15, F-16, A-10, etc. will fare poorly in a "high-threat" environment because they lack stealth (and other advanced fifth-generation fighter features, such as sensor fusion). They argue that criticism of the F-35 from surviving members of the Fighter Mafia (and defense reform movement) is unfounded.

Critics argue that the A-10 will fare poorly against MANPADS and other anti-aircraft weapons because it is designed to fly in the daytime at low-altitudes, citing loss rate statistics and disproportionate losses during Operation Desert Storm. However, a Government Accountability Office report (with loss rate statistics) notes that no clearcut conclusions can be drawn about any aircraft's survivability once the statistics are adjusted for the number of sorties, altitude, and daytime/nighttime flying. Any aircraft that flew the same number of sorties as the F-117 Nighthawk at medium altitude during nighttime likely would have suffered zero losses.

The Fighter Mafia have been criticized for their lack of combat experience and aeronautical expertise. Only Boyd has air combat experience (in the Korean War). Boyd did not fight in the Vietnam War and did not achieve any kills during his brief combat experience as a fighter pilot.  Riccioni had seen no combat before he was assigned to the Pentagon. Associate member Pierre Sprey has been characterized as "a dilettante with an engineering degree but no military experience".

References

Bibliography

External links
 Weaponization of Nostalgia: The F-15 & F-16 (Legacy of the Fighter Mafia) "Military Aviation History", YouTube

1969 establishments in the United States
Organizations established in 1969
Aerial warfare strategy
20th-century history of the United States Air Force